Philip Wilder (born 1968) is an American counter-tenor and business manager best known for his recording and concert career with the a cappella ensemble Chanticleer.

Life and career
Philip Wilder is a graduate of the Interlochen Arts Academy, the Eastman School of Music, and the Vilar Institute for Arts Management. He received a Bachelor of Music degree in organ at Eastman in 1990, and began a 13-year association with the San Francisco-based vocal ensemble Chanticleer, where he became Assistant Music Director and Director of Education. His 14 recordings for Warner Classics and Chanticleer records garnered four Grammy nominations and two Grammy Awards. He performed in more than 1,000 concerts worldwide, and fostered collaborations with many composers and performers, including Sir John Tavener, Frederica von Stade and Dawn Upshaw. 

Philip Wilder also served as Chanticleer's Director of Education, developing and implementing  programs for music students in San Francisco and across America, including its Singing in the Schools program and the Chanticleer Youth Choral Festival, an annual event for San Francisco Bay Area high school students. 

After leaving Chanticleer, Wilder took a position as Associate Director of the Capital Campaign for the Harman Center for the Arts in Washington, D.C. He was awarded a fellowship at the Kennedy Center for the Performing Arts' Vilar Institute for Arts Management, where he managed the first American tour of the Iraqi National Symphony Orchestra. In 2005, Wilder joined 21C Media Group, an independent public relations, marketing, and consulting firm specializing in classical music and the performing arts. In 2011 he was named Executive Director of Communications for the Eastman School of Music at the University of Rochester.

References

External links
Chanticleer sings Purcell

1968 births
Countertenors
Living people
Place of birth missing (living people)